Parliamentary elections were held in Cameroon on 1 March 1992. They were first multi-party elections for the National Assembly since 1964, although they were boycotted by the Social Democratic Front and the Cameroon Democratic Union. The result was a victory for the ruling (and formerly sole legal party) Cameroon People's Democratic Movement, which won 88 of the 180 seats. Voter turnout was 60.7%.

Results

References

Cameroon
Parliamentary election
Elections in Cameroon
Election and referendum articles with incomplete results
Cameroonian parliamentary election